Prognoz 9 was a Soviet satellite. It was designed to investigate residual radiation from the Big Bang and gamma flares in deep space.

Mission
The mission was of Investigation of residual radiation from the Big Bang and gamma flares in deep space, and solar corpuscular and electromagnetic radiation plasma flows and magnetic fields in circumterrestrial space to determine the effects of solar activity on the interplanetary medium and the earth's magnetosphere. In addition to the Soviet scientific apparatus, Prognoz 9 carried instruments built in Czechoslovakia and France.

Launch
Prognoz 9 was launched from the Baikonur Cosmodrome on 1 July 1983, using a Molniya-M / 8K78M-SOL carrier rocket.

Specifications
 Mass: 
 Periapsis: 
 Apoapsis: 
 Period: 38448.0 min (26.7 days)
 Inclination: 65.5°.

The spacecraft with highly eccentric orbit was spin stabilized with a period of 113 s. The spin axis pointed towards the Sun, and was repointed every few days.

See also

 1983 in spaceflight
 RELIKT-1

References

External links
 Prognoz 9 mission at NASA's HEASARC
 Prognoz 9 at Space Monitoring Data Center
 Prognoz program at Encyclopedia Astronautica

Spacecraft launched in 1983
Spacecraft launched by Molniya-M rockets
Soviet space observatories
1983 in the Soviet Union
Czechoslovakia–Soviet Union relations
France–Soviet Union relations
Gamma-ray telescopes